Poland Seminary High School is a public high school in Poland, Ohio, United States. It is the only secondary school in the Poland Local School District. Athletic teams compete as the Poland Seminary Bulldogs in the Ohio High School Athletic Association as a member of the Northeast 8 Conference

History
Although the current building was built in 1972, Poland Seminary High School owes its name to an earlier institution, Poland Seminary, which was one of the first private colleges to admit women.  In the early 1900s, the institution was deeded to The Poland Schools for $1.00 with the stipulation that it forever be called "Poland Seminary".  This former institution matriculated US President William McKinley, and the present high school claims McKinley as an alumnus. In 1999, students from the high school visited the Ohio Seventh District Court of Appeals.

OHSAA State Championships

 Boys Track and Field – 1947, 1951, 2000 
 Football – 1999 
 Girls Golf - 2008 
 Girls Softball - 2011

Notable alumni
William McKinley - 25th President of the United States
Chuck Hayes
Helen Murray Free - (1923 – 2021) chemist
Eric A. Spiegel - (1957 - ) business executive

References

External links
 District Website

High schools in Mahoning County, Ohio
Public high schools in Ohio